is a passenger railway station located in the city of Hadano, Kanagawa Prefecture, Japan.  The station operated by the private railway operator Odakyu Electric Railway.

Lines
Tsurumaki-Onsen Station is served by the Odakyu Odawara Line, and lies 55.9 rail kilometers from the line's terminal at Shinjuku Station.

Station layout
The station has two opposed side platforms with two tracks, connected to the station building by a footbridge. The station building is a one-story wooden structure. Outside the station is a stone monument commemorating the 40th anniversary of the completion of the Odakyu Odawara line.

Platforms

History
It was given its present name on 15 March 1937, but reverted to its original name in 1944 as wartime authorities felt that the onsen in the name appeared frivolous in light of wartime austerities. The current name was restored only in 1987.

Station numbering was introduced in January 2014 with Tsurumaki-Onsen being assigned station number OH37.

Passenger statistics
In fiscal 2019, the station was used by an average of 14,963 passengers daily.

The passenger figures for previous years are as shown below.

Surrounding area
Tsurumaki Hot Springs
Tsurumaki Onsen Hospital

See also
List of railway stations in Japan

References

External links

Official home page.

Railway stations in Japan opened in 1927
Odakyu Odawara Line
Railway stations in Kanagawa Prefecture
Hadano, Kanagawa